TV4 Guld is a Swedish television channel devoted to "classic" programmes such as older television dramas.

The channel launched on November 3, simultaneously with its sister channel TV4 Komedi, on satellite from Canal Digital and cable from Com Hem. The channels were not available on the Viasat satellite platform or Boxer terrestrial package from the start.

Programming
Programmes shown on TV4 Guld are mostly American, British and Australian and include:

21 Jump Street
A Family at War
Baretta
Baywatch
Beauty and the Beast
Bring 'Em Back Alive
Cannon
Cold Feet
Columbo
Dallas
Doctor Who
Dr. Quinn, Medicine Woman
Dynasty
Fame
Freddy's Nightmares
Flambards
I, Claudius
Jake and the Fatman
Kojak
La piovra
Matador
Miami Vice
Midnight Caller
Mr. Merlin
Murder, She Wrote
Moonlighting
North and South
Perry Mason
Pojken med guldbyxorna
Prisoner: Cell Block H (from May 2014)
Reilly, Ace of Spies
Secret Army
Six Feet Under
The High Chaparral
The House of Eliott
The Persuaders!
The Saint
Twin Peaks
V

References

External links
 Official site 

Television channels in Sweden
TV4 AB
Television channels and stations established in 2006